Alarmism is excessive or exaggerated alarm of a real or imagined threat. Alarmism connotes attempts to excite fears or giving warnings of great danger in a manner that is amplified, overemphasized or unwarranted. In the news media, alarmism can often be found in the form of yellow journalism where reports sensationalise a story to exaggerate small risks.

Alarmist personality
The alarmist person is subject to the cognitive distortion of catastrophizingof always expecting the worst of possible futures.

They may also be seeking to preserve feelings of omnipotence by trying to generate anxiety, apprehension and concern in others.

See also

References

Prediction
Media manipulation
Fear